Rock & Folk is a prominent French popular music magazine founded in 1966, and published in the Paris suburb of Clichy. Editor in chief were Philippe Koechlin,  Philippe Paringaux, Eric Breton, Philippe Manœuvre and now Vincent Tannières. 
Though the magazine's title includes the word "folk," it is in fact oriented strongly toward rock and roll.

During the early 1980s, the magazine reached peak distribution around 140-150 thousand copies per issue. In the 2000s, the distribution has fallen to an average of 37 to 42 thousand per issue.

The magazine has also broadened its scope of rock and folk to include coverage of newer electronic music as well as hip hop.

The magazine is also well known for prepublishing Marcel Gotlib's infamously risqué comic strip Hamster Jovial between 1971 and 1974.

References

External links
 Rock & Folk French language home page
Les Disques de l'année: Rock & Folk Rock & Folk's listing of essential 20th-century recordings  (plus critics' and readers' poll listings from selected years)

1966 establishments in France
French-language magazines
Monthly magazines published in France
Music magazines published in France
Magazines established in 1966
Magazines published in Paris